The Type C7 ship (Lancer Class) is a United States Maritime Administration (MARAD) designation for a cargo ship and the first US purpose-built container ship.  The vessels were constructed in US shipyards and entered service starting in 1968.  As US-built ships they were Jones Act qualified for shipments between US domestic ports. Under the Jones Act, domestic US maritime trade is restricted to US-built and flagged vessels of US owners and manned by predominantly US-citizen crews.  The last active Lancer container-configured ship was scrapped in 2019. Lancers of the vehicle Roll-on/Roll-off (RO/RO) configuration remain held in the Ready Reserve Force, National Defense Reserve Fleet and the US Navy Military Sealift Command. All are steam powered.

United States Lines C7-S-68 Series
Eight Type C7-S-68 ships were built by Sun Shipbuilding for the United States Lines and entered service from 1968 to 1971. Upon the bankruptcy and dissolution of the company the ships were sold to other carriers.  The design proved very reliable as all of the Lancer Class vessels operated until at least 2002. In October 2014 the last active '68 series Lancer Horizon Discovery, was delivered to the Bay Bridge Scrapyard in Brownsville, Texas. "..the Lancers revolutionized shipping as being the first true large (at that time) container ships. [They were] built for U.S. Lines and ran on the East Coast to Far East run for many years...Discovery also served in Desert Storm. Her keel was laid exactly 47 years ago on 10/26/1967..It has been an honor taking this grand ole girl to her final resting place. She sure had a good run for many years. Instead of going down kicking and screaming she ran proud and well right to the very end and went down easy." - Captain Bill Boyce

Pacific Far East Line C7-S-88 Series
Bethlehem Steel's Sparrows Point Shipyard constructed two C7-S-88a container ships for San Francisco, CA-based Pacific Far East Line (PFEL). These two ships were actually designed for and ordered by Matson Navigation, but when Matson decided to discontinue its transpacific operations the two ships were taken over by PFEL while still under construction. PFEL's ship names ended with Bear, and the two new ships were launched as SS Australia Bear and SS New Zealand Bear. Australia Bear was completed in 1973, but before New Zealand Bear had been fully outfitted both ships were sold in 1974 to Sea-Land Service, Inc. and renamed Sea-Land Consumer and Sea-Land Producer as Sealand's SL18P class.  Sea-Land was bought by the CSX Corporation in 1986, and both ships were renamed in 2000. The domestic U.S. liner operations of Sea-Land were sold in 2003 and subsequently operated under the name Horizon Lines. Their service life came in a full circle when Matson, who had initially designed the ships decades earlier, acquired Horizon Lines in 2015. The vessels would serve their new owners a few more years as Matson Consumer and Matson Producer.  They were scrapped in 2018 and 2019 respectively.

States Steamship Lines C7-S-95 Series
The States Steamship Lines (or States Lines) ordered four C7-S-95a ships from Bath Iron Works to carry both mixed and containerized cargo.  These vessels differed from the earlier C7s in that they have an aft cargo ramp. Their service speed is 23 knots and the States Lines operated the vessels between the US west coast and Asian ports. Their service time with the States Line however was brief as high fuel prices and competition drove the company into bankruptcy in 1979. The vessels were eventually acquired by the US Government and are among the 27 RO/RO ships in the Military Sealift Command.  All are steam powered and maintained in the Ready Reserve Force with 5 days as time to activate.

Waterman Line C7-S-133a Series
Three C7 ships in the RO/RO configuration, designated as MARAD design C7-S-1331a, were built for the Waterman Line.  The John B. Waterman and Thomas Heyward were completed by Sun Shipbuilding.  The Charles Carroll was subcontracted to the General Dynamics Quincy Shipbuilding Division.  These would be the last ships constructed by the respective shipyards before their closure. In 1984-1985 all three were converted to pre-positioning supply ships for the US Navy Military Sealift Command (MSC) by the National Steel and Shipbuilding Company, San Diego, CA.  The ships gained 157 feet amidships, a helicopter landing platform, and cranes to enable them to unload their own cargo. They retained their steam boilers but were retrofitted with two GE turbines. As of July 2020 all three were in the inventory of the MSC. All three ships were commissioned into the MSC as Sgt. Matej Kocak-class dry cargo ships.

References

External links
 Image of American Lancer as shown while in San Francisco Bay in February 1971
 Image of Horizon Challenger (ex-American Legion) in 2010 showing raised wheel house

Ship types
Container ships
Types